Malladi is name of a village in Palnadu district (erstwhile Guntur district) of the Indian state of Andhra Pradesh, and is also an Indian surname.

People

 Malladi Brothers, Malladi Sreeramprasad and Malladi Ravikumar, are a Carnatic music vocalist duo.
 Malladi Amulya, is an author.
 Malladi Chandrasekhara Sastry, a scholar in the Vedas and Puranas texts.
 Malladi Ramakrishna Sastry, Telugu writer and lyricist.
 Malladi Satyalingam Naicker, founder of M.S.N.Charities by his will.
 Malladi Venkata Krishna Murthy is a Telugu writer.
 Malladi Lakshmi Narayana is a very popular Telugu Astrologer.

Place
Malladi, Guntur district, a village in Guntur district of Andhra Pradesh

Indian surnames